Inés Fernández Moreno (born in Buenos Aires, 1947) is an Argentinian novelist who has published several stories and novels. She is a recipient of the Sor Juana Inés de la Cruz Prize.

Early life 
After studying in Spain and France with a scholarship, she graduated in Literature from the University of Buenos Aires (UBA). In addition, she is the granddaughter of the poet Baldomero Fernández Moreno and the daughter of the novelist César Fernández Moreno. She started writing at the age of 35.

Professional career 

She graduated in Literature from the University of Buenos Aires (UBA), which allowed her to order the anarchy of her readings that went from Corin Tellado to Dostoyevsky. Years before, she studied in France and Spain with a scholarship, where she resided between 2002 and 2005. She has worked in the advertising sector. Currently, she works in various places and organises literary workshops.

Literary work and prizes 
In 1991, she was a finalist in the  ‘Juan Rulfo’ Prize with her story ‘Dios lo bendiga’. The next year, in 1992, she was the winner of the  ‘La Felguera’ Prize in Asturias (Spain) with her story ‘Madre para armar’.  In 1993, she came in second place for the 'Premio Municipal de la Ciudad de Buenos Aires' with her story ‘La vida en la cornisa’.  A few years later, in 1996,  she came in second place again, this time for the ‘Premio Ediciones. Desde la Gente’ with her story ‘Todo lo que no he perdido’. A year later, in 1997, she won the ‘Premio Municipal de la Ciudad de Buenos Aires’, this time she came first with her novel ‘Un amor de agua’. En 1999, she wrote the only one of her pieces of work that has been translated into Italian, ‘La última vez que maté a mi madre’. With this novel she came first again in the ‘Premio Municipal de la Ciudad de Buenos Aires’, and also the  ‘Letras de Oro 2000 de Honorarte’ Prize. In 2003, she wrote ‘Hombres como médanos’, and she also won the ‘Max Aub’ Prize in Spain with her story ‘En extinción’.  Likewise, in 2015, she wrote ‘La profesora de español’ a novel based on her experience living in Marbella (Spain) from 2002 to 2005. Two years later, in 2007, she won the ‘Hucha de Oro’ Prize awarded by FUNCAS, also in Spain, with the novel ‘Carne de exportación’. In 2009 and 2013, she wrote her two last novels: ‘El cielo no existe’ and ‘Mármara’.

Work style 
The stories of Inés Fernández Moreno have a humorous tone and some intimate Costumbrismo. According to the critic Julio Ortega "Her stories have an immediate transparency: they discuss the world and human relations with the lightness recommended by Calvin.

References 

Argentine women novelists
Living people
1947 births